The Marcopeet Islands are members of the Arctic Archipelago in the territory of Nunavut. They are located in Hudson Bay, northwest of the Belcher Islands. The Marcopeet Islands measure .

References 

Islands of Hudson Bay
Uninhabited islands of Qikiqtaaluk Region